Maria Dolores is short for La Virgen María de los Dolores (Our Lady of Sorrows) in Spanish.

Maria Dolores may also refer to:

People
María Dolores Agüero (born 1982), Honduran politician
Maria Dolores Aguilar (born 1958), Spanish entrepreneur and politician
María Dolores Bedoya (1783–1853), Guatemalan activist
María Dolores Campana (born 1975), Ecuadorean tennis player
María Dolores Castellón Vargas (1936–2016), Spanish singer
María Dolores de Cospedal (born 1965), Spanish politician
María Dolores Dancausa (born 1959), Spanish executive
María Dolores Dueñas Navarro (born 1971), Spanish actress
María Dolores Forner Toro (born 1960), Spanish actress
María Dolores Izaguirre de Ruiz (1891–1979), Mexican First Lady
María Dolores Katarain (1954–1986), Basque separatist leader
Maria Dolores Malumbres (1931–2019), Spanish pianist, music educator and composer
María Dolores Molina (born 1966), Guatemalan cyclist
María Dolores Ortega Tzitzihua (born 1956), Mexican politician
María Dolores Pradera (1924–2018), Spanish singer and actress
María Dolores Pulido (born 1974), Spanish long-distance runner
María Dolores del Río (born 1960), Mexican politician
María Dolores Rodríguez Sopeña (1848–1918), Spanish Catholic nun
María Dolores Tarrero-Serrano (1924–2010), Cuban First Lady

Arts, entertainment, and media
María Dolores, a 1953 Spanish drama film
"Maria Dolores", a song by Joan Baez in her 1971 album Blessed Are...

Transport
María Dolores Airport, an airport in Chile
, a 2006 high-speed catamaran ferry

See also
Maria (disambiguation)
Dolores (disambiguation)